James Glenn Driver (August 10, 1889 – October 1975) was an American football, basketball, and baseball player, coach, and college athletics administrator.  He served as the head football coach at Newberry College in 1916 and at The College of William & Mary from 1919 to 1920, compiling a career college football record of 11–13–1.  He was also the head basketball coach at the University of South Carolina from 1911 to 1913 and at William & Mary from 1919 to 1923, amassing a career college basketball record of 36–24.  In addition, he was the head baseball coach at South Carolina from 1912 to 1913 and at William & Mary from 1920 to 1923, tallying a career college baseball mark of 56–39–1.  Driver served as the athletic director at William & Mary from 1919 to 1923 and at the University of Virginia from 1929 to 1935.

In 1988, Driver was inducted into the Virginia Sports Hall of Fame.

Coaching career
Driver was the head coach for the William & Mary basketball team for the 1919–20 through 1922–23 seasons. During his four years at the helm, he produced a 31–16 record. Driver was also the head coach of the William & Mary football team for two seasons, 1919 and 1920. He compiled a 6–11–1 record during that time.

Prior to William & Mary, Driver was the head coach of the South Carolina Gamecocks men's basketball team from 1911 to 1913. In his only two seasons he compiled a 5–7 record.

Head coaching record

Football

References

External links
 James Driver profile at the Virginia Sports Hall of Fame

1889 births
1975 deaths
American men's basketball coaches
American men's basketball players
Baseball players from Virginia
Basketball coaches from Virginia
Basketball players from Virginia
College men's basketball head coaches in the United States
Newberry Wolves football coaches
People from Harrisonburg, Virginia
Players of American football from Virginia
South Carolina Gamecocks baseball coaches
South Carolina Gamecocks men's basketball coaches
Sportspeople from Williamsburg, Virginia
Virginia Cavaliers athletic directors
Virginia Cavaliers football players
William & Mary Tribe athletic directors
William & Mary Tribe baseball coaches
William & Mary Tribe baseball players
William & Mary Tribe football coaches
William & Mary Tribe football players
William & Mary Tribe men's basketball coaches
William & Mary Tribe men's basketball players